Steven Foley-Sheridan (or Steven Foley, born 10 February 1986) is an Irish former professional footballer who played for AFC Bournemouth. He played in midfield and featured in Aston Villa's FA Youth Cup win in 2002, and in their run to the final two years later. After over 2 years out injured with a serious back injury, Foley retired in 2008 and returned home where he now manages a fitness centre in Dublin city.

Honours

Aston Villa
FA Youth Cup 2001–02

Individual
 FAI Under-16 International Player of the Year (1): 2002

External links
Steven Foley-Sheridan player profile at afcb.co.uk

1986 births
Living people
AFC Bournemouth players
Aston Villa F.C. players
Republic of Ireland association footballers
Association footballers from County Dublin
Association football midfielders
Republic of Ireland expatriate association footballers